Nitro Burnin' Funny Daddy is the eleventh solo album from American musician Brian Setzer, released in 2003 on Surfdog Records. He said, when released, that it was the most personal record he had ever done. He ventured away from his traditional "hot rod rockabilly side" and wrote more about love ("That Someone Just Ain't You"), faith ("St. Jude") and death ("Sixty Years").

Track listing 

All songs written by Brian Setzer, unless otherwise stated.

 "Sixty Years" - 4:42
 "Don't Trust a Woman (In a Black Cadillac)" - 3:46
 "When The Bells Don't Chime" - 3:07
 "That Someone Just Ain't You" - 3:55
 "Rat Pack Boogie" - 4:21
 "Ring, Ring, Ring" - 2:47
 "Drink Whiskey and Shut Up" - 4:25
 "Smokin' 'N Burnin'" - 4:25
 "Wild Wind" (Terry Gilkyson) - 3:16
 "St. Jude" - 4:28
 "To Be Loved" (Ken Goodloe, Joe Jones, Carl McGinnis, Otis Munson, Ted Goodloe) - 2:22
 "When The Bells Don't Chime" (Banjo Mix) - 3:07

Personnel 
 Brian Setzer - lead vocals, electric guitar, banjo
 Johnny Hatton - double bass
 Bernie Dresel - drums, percussion
Joie Shettler, Julie Reiten - backing vocals
Technical
Jeff Peters - engineer
Chris Lord-Alge - mixing
William Hames - cover photography

References 

2003 albums
Brian Setzer albums
Surfdog Records albums